Live Best is a compilation album by Girugamesh, released on March 26, 2014. It released to commemorate Girugamesh's tenth anniversary as a band. The album is not a live album, but a collection of tracks the band often included in their set lists, which is why it is titled Live Best. The track list is put together with the image of a concert set list. The album also has the purpose of serving as a guide to Girugamesh's live shows. All songs have been re-mixed, and some parts have been re-recorded.

Track listing

References 

Girugamesh albums
2014 compilation albums